Statistics of the Scottish Football League in season 1908–09.

Scottish League Division One

Scottish League Division Two

See also
1908–09 in Scottish football

References

 
1908-09